Attribution may refer to:

 Attribution (copyright), concept in copyright law requiring an author to be credited
 Attribution (journalism), the identification of the source of reported information
 Attribution (law),  legal doctrines by which liability is extended to a defendant who did not actually commit the criminal act
 Attribution (marketing), concept in marketing of assigning a value to a marketing activity based on desired outcome
 Attribution (psychology), concept in psychology whereby people attribute traits and causes to things they observe
 Performance attribution, technique in quantitative finance for explaining the active performance of a portfolio

See also
 Attribute (disambiguation)
 Credits